Megachile apposita is a species of bee in the family Megachilidae. It was described by Rayment in 1939.

References

Apposita
Insects described in 1939